The 2013 Savannah Challenger was a professional tennis tournament played on clay courts. It was the fifth edition of the tournament which was part of the 2013 ATP Challenger Tour. It took place in Savannah, Georgia, United States between 22 and 28 April 2013.

Singles main draw entrants

Seeds

 1 Rankings are as of April 15, 2013.

Other entrants
The following players received wildcards into the singles main draw:
  Sekou Bangoura
  Mardy Fish
  Mitchell Krueger
  Tennys Sandgren

The following players received entry as a special exempt into the singles main draw:
  Alex Kuznetsov
  Denys Molchanov

The following players received entry from the qualifying draw:
  Taro Daniel
  Bjorn Fratangelo
  Nicolás Massú
  Ricardo Rodríguez

The following player received entry as a lucky loser:
  Nikoloz Basilashvili

Doubles main draw entrants

Seeds

1 Rankings as of April 15, 2013.

Other entrants
The following pairs received wildcards into the doubles main draw:
  Reid Carleton /  Vahid Mirzadeh
  Bjorn Fratangelo /  Mitchell Krueger
  Daniel Regan /  Georgi Rumenov Payakov

The following pair received entry using a protected ranking:
  Ilija Bozoljac /  Somdev Devvarman

The following pairs received entry from the qualifying draw:
  David Rice /  Sean Thornley

Champions

Singles

 Ryan Harrison def.  Facundo Argüello, 6–2, 6–3

Doubles

 Teymuraz Gabashvili /  Denys Molchanov def.  Michael Russell /  Tim Smyczek, 6–2, 7–5

External links
Official Website

Savannah Challenger
Savannah Challenger
Tennis tournaments in Georgia (U.S. state)